

Legend

List

References

1998-99